Archimandrite Roman (secular name Michael Vadimovich Krassovsky, ; born 1959, San Mateo, California) is Archimandrite of the Russian Orthodox Church Outside Russia and current chief of the ROCOR Russian Ecclesiastical Mission in Jerusalem.

Biography
He was born in 1959 in San Mateo. He was the youngest of four sons to Larissa and Vadim Krassovsky. His elder brothers named Vladimir, Eugene and Alexander. His parents were close to Archbishop John of Shanghai and San Francisco, who blessed their marriage in refugee camp in Tubabao and was a frequent guest at their house in Burlingame, California.

On the eve of the Praise of the Mother of God in 1992, Michael Krassovsky was tonsured a monk by Archbishop Laurus (Škurla) of Syracuse and Holy Trinity, and given the name Roman, in honor of St Roman the Melodist. On July 17, 1993 by same bishop Monk Roman was ordained to the rank of hierodeacon. On May 6, 1994, on Bright Friday, by same bishop he was ordained to the rank of hieromonk.

February 11, 2005 During the Small Entrance at the Liturgy, Metropolitan Laurus (Škurla) awarded Hieromonk Roman (Krassovsky) the right to wear the Golden Cross in recognition of his many labors, which include heading the Holy Trinity Seminary and Monastery choir and teaching church music in Seminary.

In May 2007, he visited Russia  part of a clergymen-pilgrims from different dioceses of ROCOR to ceremony of the signing of the Act of Canonical Communion.

June 14, 2012, the Synod of Bishops of the Russian Orthodox Church Outside of Russia appointed Hieromonk Roman (Krassovsky) as Acting Chief of the Russian Ecclesiastical Mission in Jerusalem (deputy of the sick Archimandrite Tikhon (Amelchenya)). On October 9, 2012 Synod of Bishops of ROCOR relieved Archimandrite Tikhon (Amelchenya) of his duties as Chief of ROCOR Russian Ecclesiastical Mission in Jerusalem. Hieromonk Roman (Krassovsky) appointed Acting Chief of the REM. November 8, 2012, Hieromonk Roman (Krassovsky), accompanied Archbishop Mark (Arndt) of Berlin and Germany, Overseer of the REM, arrived to Jerusalem. Archbishop Mark introduced Fr Roman to Patriarch Theophilos III of Jerusalem, who blessed Fr Roman's new obedience.

The Synod of Bishops of the Russian Orthodox Church Outside of Russia has confirmed Fr Roman as the Chief of the Russian Ecclesiastical Mission in Jerusalem and On April 20, 2013, Akathistos Saturday, Archbishop Mark of Berlin and Germany elevated Hieromonk Roman (Krassovsky) to the rank of hegumen in Holy Ascension Convent on the Mount of Olives.

On April 21, the Fifth Sunday of Great Lent, Archbishop Mark officiated at Divine Liturgy at St Mary Magdalene Convent in Gethsemane; and During the minor entrance he elevated Fr. Roman to the rank of archimandrite. Archbishop Mark then congratulated Fr. Roman and gave him an abbot's staff.

References  

Chiefs of the Russian Orthodox Ecclesiastical Mission in Jerusalem
People from San Mateo, California
People from Burlingame, California